Memory Phiri (born 12 May 1998) is a Zambian association football forward who plays for Southwestern Oklahoma State University in the United States of America.

Club career
After playing for the high school in Lusaka, she joined the Green Buffaloes Women’s Football Team from 2013 to 2014 where she scored 42 goals in 30 appearances. In 2015, she was offered a scholarship to study medicine at Northern Oklahoma College in the United States of America. She played for the college from 2015 to 2016 where she scored 31 goals in 31 appearances.

Southwest Oklahoma State University (SWOSU) named Memory Phiri the Great American Conference Offensive Player of the Week (i.e. week two of October 2018) making it twice in 2018 season.

International
She was invited for the trials for Zambia's inaugural women's Under-17 side and was later selected for a tournament in Sweden where she scored a bicycle kick. From that impressive performance, she received a call-up for the Under-17 World Cup qualifiers. She represented Zambia at the 2014 FIFA U-17 Women's World Cup in Costa Rica, turning out in all three games as Zambia won one game on its tournament debut.

References

1998 births
Living people
Zambian women's footballers
Zambia women's international footballers
Women's association football forwards
Zambian expatriate women's footballers
Zambian expatriate sportspeople in the United States
Expatriate women's soccer players in the United States
People from Chilubi District
Southwestern Oklahoma State Bulldogs women's soccer players
Northern Oklahoma Mavericks women's soccer players